Edward O'Rourke, full name Eduard Alexander Ladislaus Graf O'Rourke (October 26, 1876 in Minsk – June 27, 1943) was a Roman Catholic priest, bishop of Riga and the first head of the bishopric of the Free City of Danzig (Gdańsk).

Early life

O'Rourke was born October 26, 1876 in Basin, Minsk, Russian Empire (modern Belarus), to an aristocratic family of Irish ancestry, many of them high officers in the Russian military. The most prominent was Joseph Cornelius O'Rourke. They held imperial titles of the Russian Empire and of the German Holy Roman Empire, but also had petitioned to retain the Irish count title as well, which was granted by the Tsar in 1848. His father was Michael Graf O'Rourke and his mother Baltic-German Angelika von Bochwitz. He received a broad European education and learned a number of languages.

After graduating in 1898 from the famous Jesuit School in Chyrów, then in Galicia, Austria-Hungary, now in Ukraine, he went to Riga, Latvia to study. In 1903 he graduated from the Trade and Mechanics Faculty of the University of Riga. In 1903 he moved to Freiburg, Switzerland, where he continued his studies at the University of Fribourg, faculty of law. The following year O'Rourke moved to the theological faculty at the University of Innsbruck in Austria-Hungary.

On October 27, 1908 he was ordained priest in Wilno, now in Lithuania. He became a professor of ecclesiastical history, German and French at the Seminary of the Roman Catholic Archdiocese of Minsk-Mohilev in Saint Petersburg. Between 1912 and 1915, he was parish priest of the multilingual congregation of St. Stanislaus in Petersburg.

After the February Revolution in Russia, the church decided to re-establish the diocese of Minsk; O'Rourke was appointed as its administrator and the interim head of the Catholic Church in Russia. He met Achille Ratti for the first time, the Apostolic Visitor for the Baltic Countries and later Pope Pius XI. Due to the proposed independence of Latvia, in 1918 the diocese of Riga was established. O'Rourke was appointed bishop of Riga on the recommendation of Ratti on 29 September 1918.

O'Rourke's position in Riga was problematic as German forces occupied the city in early 1919. By the end of World War I, the ecclesiastical organisation was largely destroyed, and only a few priests remained. O'Rourke did not speak Latvian but tried to encourage Latvian priests. He resigned after a new government in Latvia was appointed and there was a popular movement calling for an ethnic Latvian bishop. He was released from Riga in April 1920 and named  titular bishop of Canea He was appointed Apostolic Delegate for the Baltic States. In November 1921 he was also appointed the Pontifical Delegate for Russian refugees in Danzig and East Prussia, and in 1928 for Catholic Russians in Germany.

Free City of Danzig
The Free City of Danzig was split from Germany in 1920. On April 24, 1922 Achille Ratti, then Pope Pius XI, nominated O'Rourke to the post of an Apostolic Administrator of the Free City of Danzig, and, on 21 December 1922, as the titular bishop of Pergamon. After the creation of the Diocese of Danzig on December 30, 1925, O'Rourke was appointed as the first Bishop of Danzig. He initially established good relations with the authorities (who granted him citizenship on 12 June 1926) and the mostly Protestant population. After the Nazis took over the area in 1933, he came into conflict with them over their policies.

He hosted a synod from 10 to 12 December 1935, but growing pressure from the Nazi-majority senate made him resign as bishop of Danzig after he had tried to appoint four additional Polish parish priests.

On 13 June 1938 he was appointed Titular bishop of Sophene. He adopted Polish citizenship in December 1938 and was made Cathedral Canon in Gniezno/Poznań. 
When the Germans attacked Poland in September 1939, O'Rourke was on a journey to Estonia. He traveled via Warsaw and Königsberg to Berlin, where he applied for a Visa to Italy. After going to Rome, O'Rourke tried to return to his Diocese in Poznań, but his visa application was rejected by the Germans.

O'Rourke died in Rome on June 27, 1943. His successor as Bishop of Danzig (and later Gdańsk) was Carl Maria Splett.

In 1972 O'Rourke's ashes were moved from Campo Verano to his former bishopric, now in Poland; they were buried in a crypt in the Oliwa Cathedral.

Ancestry and relations

 John O'Rourke (1728–1786)
 Cornelius O'Rourke
 Lieutenant General Joseph Cornelius O'Rourke (1772–1849)
 Count Moritz O'Rourke
 Count Nicholas O'Rourke

See also

References

Literature 
Stefan Samerski: Die Katholische Kirche in der Freien Stadt Danzig 1920–1933. Köln u.a. 1991
Stefan Samerski (Hrsg.): Das Bistum Danzig in Lebensbildern. Ordinarien, Weihbischöfe, Generalvikare, apostolische Visitatoren 1922/25 bis 2000. (= Religions- und Kulturgeschichte in Ostmittel- und Südosteuropa 3). Münster/Hamburg/London 2003. 
“Documents and Materials for the History of the O'Rourke Family” by Eduard Graf O'Rourke (O'Rourke had travelled to Ireland in the 1920s to research his Irish ancestry)

External links

Religious Life
Das Bistum Danzig, Stefan Samerski, Page 39 Eduard Graf O'Rourke w. portrait
Document by the Danzig Senate of Freie Stadt Danzig: citizenship of Bishop O'Rourke form 12 June 1926

1876 births
1943 deaths
Bishops of Riga
20th-century Roman Catholic bishops in Poland
People from the Russian Empire of Irish descent
Polish people of Irish descent
Latvian people of Irish descent
Belarusian people of Irish descent
Polish people of German descent
Clergy from Minsk
University of Latvia alumni
University of Fribourg alumni
University of Innsbruck alumni
Apostolic Nuncios to Estonia
Apostolic Nuncios to Latvia
Apostolic Nuncios to Lithuania
People from the Free City of Danzig
Russian emigrants to Germany
Russian emigrants to Poland
Polish people of World War II
Russian expatriates in Switzerland
20th-century Roman Catholic bishops in Latvia
Edward, O'Rourke